Temple Guiting Manor is an early 16th-century house at Temple Guiting, Gloucestershire, England. It is a Grade I listed building, and is in private ownership.

References

External links

Grade I listed houses in Gloucestershire
Houses in Gloucestershire
Temple Guiting